Shoreditch and Finsbury was a parliamentary constituency centred on the Shoreditch district of the East End of London and the adjacent Finsbury area.  It returned one Member of Parliament (MP) to the House of Commons of the Parliament of the United Kingdom, using the first-past-the-post system of voting.

The constituency was created for the 1950 general election, partially replacing the previous Shoreditch and Finsbury constituencies, which had seen a significant fall in population.

Shoreditch and Finsbury was itself abolished for the February 1974 general election, when its territory was divided between two new constituencies: Islington South & Finsbury and Hackney South & Shoreditch.

Boundaries 

The constituency consisted of the Metropolitan Borough of Shoreditch and the Metropolitan Borough of Finsbury. In 1965, Shoreditch was absorbed into the London Borough of Hackney and Finsbury into the London Borough of Islington; however the constituency boundaries remained unchanged until the seat disappeared in 1974.

Members of Parliament

Election results

Elections in the 1950s

Elections in the 1960s

Elections in the 1970s

References 

 Richard Kimber's political Science Resources: UK General Elections since 1832
 

Parliamentary constituencies in London (historic)
Constituencies of the Parliament of the United Kingdom established in 1950
Constituencies of the Parliament of the United Kingdom disestablished in 1974
Parliamentary constituencies in the London Borough of Hackney
Politics of the London Borough of Islington
Shoreditch